Plinia coronata, commonly known as  (king jabuticaba), is a species of plant in the family Myrtaceae. It is endemic to south-eastern Brazil. The tree grows to between 4 and 12 metres tall, and produces purple, edible fruit, which is between 25 and 30mm in diameter.

References

coronata
Crops originating from the Americas
Crops originating from Brazil
Tropical fruit
Endemic flora of Brazil
Fruits originating in South America
Cauliflory
Fruit trees
Berries